The Comino Police Station (Maltese: L-għassa tal-Pulizija ta ’Kemmuna) is the only operating police station located on the small island of Comino in the Maltese Archipelago, on the coast of the Santa Marija Bay,  north of the Comino Chapel.

Construction 
The station was built in 1743 by Grand Master Pinto to halt illegal activities such as smuggling and quarantine evasion that potentially spread the plague. It cost 456 scudi.

Application 
During World War II, it was an Allied observation post. Later, officers delivered mail to the island's inhabitants, enforced boat speed limits near beaches and provided first aid.

References 

Comino
Police stations in Malta